Magnus Magnusson (1929–2007) was an Icelandic-born and British-based television presenter, journalist, translator and writer.

Magnus Magnusson may also refer to:

 Magnus Magnusson, Earl of Orkney, Earl of Orkney between 1273 and 1284
 Magnús Magnússon (strongman), Icelandic strongman and former winner of Iceland's Strongest Man
 Magnús Ver Magnússon (born 1963), Icelandic powerlifter and strongman, and four-time World's Strongest Man
 Magnús Helgi Magnússon (1922–2006), Icelandic politician